A Dead-Ender's Reunion is the first compilation album by post-metal band Rosetta, and their fourth fully independent release. The album was announced on Rosetta's blog on October 19, 2015 and self-released as a download via Bandcamp on January 12, 2016 using the Pay what you want pricing system.

Track listing
"Back to Where You Began" – 5:54
"(Untitled VI) [Living Phantoms remix]" – 6:48
"Rain Falling on a Factory Roof [Redux]" – 9:54
"(Untitled III) [Living Phantoms remix]" – 6:23
"Red in Tooth and Claw [SP808 remix]" – 7:39
"The Nomad" – 5:01
"Hodoku [Living Phantoms remix]" – 5:28
"The Order of Things" - 5:27
"Oku [Living Phantoms remix]" – 6:04
"Au Pays Natal [2005 Acoustic]" – 13:27

Bonus tracks
"Renew (Quiet) [live]" - 8:03
"Ryu / Tradition (Quiet) [live]" - 9:50
"Départe [2003 demo]" - 7:36
"Europa [2003 demo]" - 10:51
"Song1 [2003 demo]" - 5:32
"Ryu / Tradition [demo]" - 10:23
"Myo / The Miraculous [demo]" - 3:03
"Lift [Fall 2005 demo]" - 13:00
"Clavius [Fall 2005 demo]" - 12:09
"Red in Tooth and Claw [Fall 2005 demo]" - 12:37
"Je N'en Connais Pas la Fin [Summer 2009 demo]" - 5:38
"A Determinism of Morality [Summer 2009 demo]" - 9:00

References

2016 albums
Rosetta (band) albums
Self-released albums